Democratic Defense was one of the many anti-dictatorial struggle groups that fought against the Greek military junta of 1967–1974. It evolved from the "Alexandros Papanastasiou" political research group in 1967, as a response to the regime.

In reality, there was no leader, but after arrest, the members nominated as leader a prominent retired general, general George Iordanides, because he was the best-known personality among all the participants as he had held high ranking positions in the NATO during the 1950s. The organisation responded to the brutal regime with bombings to some targets that represented the financial supporters of the junta (like the Esso-PAPPAS gas station blowing in 1969).

The trial began in March 1970, and most of the members were condemned to heavy sentences after months of trial. The trial attracted the attention of the press, and it was considered as a major act of resistance against the regime of the colonels because many of the accused persons held important positions in the public life of Greece and they represented an intellectual elite with center/center left views of governance. Thus this organisation achieved to shake the impression that people who belonged to the establishment were continuing to support the junta, especially when it was revealed to the eyes of the public that generals, lawyers or active judges, who were amongst them, had developed a dynamic form of resistance against the military regime. With the collapse of the junta in 1974 most of the members of the group aligned with Andreas Papandreou and they were integrated in the PASOK political party, even though their views were not absolutely similar to the political beliefs of the party leader,

Andreas Papandreou

See also 
 History of Modern Greece
 Greek military junta of 1967–1974

Resistance to the Greek junta
Defunct political parties in Greece
Left-wing militant groups in Greece